The Kington and Eardisley Railway took over the Kington Tramway, which served the Welsh Marches border town of Kington, Herefordshire. A year later it replaced the remainder of the tramway with a branch west to New Radnor. Between these two branches it had running powers on the Titley Junction to Kington section of the Leominster and Kington Railway. The Eardisley branch closed in 1940, the New Radnor branch in 1951.

History
The two branches cost £263,459 to build, of which £5,100 was lent by the Great Western Railway (GWR). The company was bought by the GWR on 1 July 1897. Debenture shares were bought for £62 10s per £100 share and ordinary £100 shares for £2.

Titley Junction - Eardisley
When the Hay Tramway was authorised for conversion to a railway in 1859, it was decided that its extension, the Kington Tramway, would also need to be converted. The tramway shares were bought for £45 for each £100 share by an agreement dated 19 December 1861. The Kington and Eardisley Railway Act received Royal Assent on 30 June 1862, authorising the company to raise £100,000, buy and convert the Kington Tramway to standard gauge and build a link from Lyonshall to Marston, which was never built. Thomas Savin, the railway contractor, backed the scheme, though his  £16,000 of shares were sold when he went bankrupt in January 1866. Running powers over the Leominster and Kington Railway from Kington to Titley Junction were agreed on 14 April 1868. The line opened on 3 August 1874.

Kington - New Radnor
After the Leominster and Kington Railway opened to Kington in 1857, most of the lime traffic from Burlinjobb (between Dolyhir and Stanner) was transferred from the  tramway (from 1862 owned by the Kington and Eardisley Railway) to the railway at Kington. The lime traffic was increasing and it was hoped to build a railway to Rhayader and Aberystwyth, so the Kington and Eardisley Railway got an Act for a railway from Kington to New Radnor, mainly parallel to the tramway, on 16 June 1873. It opened on 25 September 1875.

Operations
All the lines were worked by the GWR from their Kington shed using two locos. Initially they were 0-6-0 saddle tanks, then from about 1900 0-4-2 and 2-4-0 tanks, and finally GWR 5800 Class tanks. Passenger trains were formed of three or four coach sets of four wheelers, until eight wheel coaches were introduced in the late 1920s. Both branches were worked on the train staff system.

Closure
The Eardisley branch never carried much regular traffic and closed on 1 January 1917 (the list of stations closed in 1917 shows at least 125 others closed for wartime economy). Its rails were shipped overseas. It reopened with one train a day from Titley to Almeley on 18 September 1922 and fully on 11 December 1922. Wartime brought final closure on 1 July 1940.

Stanner became an unstaffed halt from April 1938 and coal shortages (explained in a House of Commons speech as due to weather and productivity declines) stopped all passenger trains to New Radnor from 5 February 1951. The line from Dolyhir to New Radnor closed completely from 31 December 1951 and the rest of the line in 1958

References

External links
1949-1954 one inch to one mile map showing stations to New Radnor open and track of old Eardisley branch
Geograph photo of Lyonshall station and bridge abutments with map
Herefordshire Through Time

Rail transport in Herefordshire
Great Western Railway constituents
Railway stations in Great Britain opened in 1874
Railway stations in Great Britain opened in 1875
Railway stations in Great Britain closed in 1917
Railway stations in Great Britain closed in 1940
Railway stations in Great Britain closed in 1951
1874 establishments in Wales
Kington, Herefordshire